Polystyle Publications Ltd was a British publisher of children's comics and books that operated from 1960 to 1997, publishing such titles as TV Comic, I-Spy, Pippin, Countdown/TV Action, and BEEB.

The company's registered offices were at Polly Perkins House, Paddington Green, 382/386 Edgware Road, London W2. Its publications were distributed in the United Kingdom by The Argus Press Ltd of 12/18 Paul Street, London EC2. Overseas, Polystyle's publications were distributed by its sole agents: for Australia and New Zealand, Messrs Gordon & Gotch (Asia) Ltd; for South Africa, the Central News Agency Ltd.

History 
The company was incorporated as TV Publications on 12 May 1960, ostensibly to publish TV Comic, which it had acquired from Beaverbrook Newspapers.

The company changed its name to Polystyle Publications Ltd in March 1968. It dissolved in 1997 due to insolvency.

Titles
Among the titles that it published were:

 BEEB (1985)
 Buttons for Play School Children (1981–90)
 Countdown/TV Action (1971–73)
 I-Spy ( 1967– 1982)
 Pippin (1966–1986)
 Playland (1968–1975)
 Read To Me (1977)
 Target (1978)
 TV Comic (1960–1984; acquired from Beaverbrook, where it originated in 1951)
 TV Comic Annual (1960–1985)
 TV Comic Holiday Special (23 issues, 1962–1985)

References

Children's book publishers
Comic book publishing companies of the United Kingdom
Companies disestablished in 1997
Publishing companies based in London
Publishing companies established in 1960
1960 establishments in the United Kingdom
1997 disestablishments in the United Kingdom
Defunct companies of the United Kingdom